Gérard Denis Cohen is a Computer Science Professor with Telecom ParisTech (ENST) in Paris, France.

Cohen was awarded with Ph.D. from the Pierre and Marie Curie University where he studied under the mentorships of Robert Fortet and Michel Deza. His dissertation thesis was on "Distance Minimale et Enumeration de Poids des Codes Lineaires
Mathematics Subject Classification: 05—Combinatorics".

Cohen was appointed a Fellow of the Institute of Electrical and Electronics Engineers (IEEE) in 2013 for his contributions to combinatorial aspects of coding theory.

References

External links

20th-century births
Living people
French electrical engineers
Pierre and Marie Curie University alumni
Fellow Members of the IEEE
Year of birth missing (living people)
Place of birth missing (living people)